The 1996 CIBC Canadian Senior Curling Championships were held January 20 to 27, 1996 in Medicine Hat, Alberta.

On the men's side, Team Ontario, skipped by Bob Turcotte won his first of three Senior titles, the seventh men's championship for Ontario. The women's side was also won by Ontario, skipped by Jill Greenwood who won her third of four national Senior championships, the fourth for Ontario.

Men's

Teams

Standings

Results

Draw 1

Draw 2

Draw 3

Draw 4

Draw 5

Draw 6

Draw 7

Draw 8

Draw 9

Draw 10

Draw 11

Draw 12

Draw 13

Draw 14

Draw 15

Draw 16

Draw 17

Playoffs

Semifinal

Final

Women's

Teams

Standings

Results

Draw 1

Draw 2

Draw 3

Draw 4

Draw 5

Draw 6

Draw 7

Draw 8

Draw 9

Draw 10

Draw 11

Draw 12

Draw 13

Draw 14

Draw 15

Draw 16

Draw 17

Playoffs

Semifinal

Final

External links
Men's statistics
Women's statistics

References

1996 in Canadian curling
Canadian Senior Curling Championships
Curling competitions in Alberta
Canadian Senior Curling
Sport in Medicine Hat
January 1996 sports events in North America